George IX (Georgian: გიორგი IX, Giorgi IX) (died 1539) was a king of the Georgian kingdom of Kartli from 1525 to 1527 (or 1534).

The second son of the Georgian king Constantine II, he succeeded on the abdication of his elder brother, David X, in 1525. The relations of the king with other members of the royal family were strained. That may have forced George to withdraw to a monastery under the name of Gerasime, leaving the throne to his energetic nephew, Luarsab I. The sources are confused about when exactly George IX abdicated, some claiming it occurred in 1527 (more accepted date) while others placing the event around 1534.

References
Georgian Soviet Encyclopedia, V. 3, p. 161, Tbilisi, 1978
Marie-Félicité Brosset, Histoire de la Géorgie. Livraison II : Histoire moderne de la Géorgie, réédition Adamant Media Corporation, p. 24 à 27.

Kings of Kartli
Bagrationi dynasty of the Kingdom of Kartli
1539 deaths
16th-century people from Georgia (country)
Eastern Orthodox monarchs
Year of birth unknown